HardBall II is a baseball video game developed by Distinctive Software and published by Accolade for IBM PC compatibles (1989). Macintosh and Amiga version were released in 1990. It is the sequel to HardBall! which was released in 1985.

Gameplay
HardBall II maintains the game play mechanics from HardBall! and adds the following features:

Updates and stores stats in "virtually every conceivable category."
Stats change from at-bat to at-bat, from game to game.
Pickoffs
League play
Team editor
More frames of animation per player.
Shift the infield and outfield according to each hitter.
Addition of seven different stadiums and five different views.
TV Instant Replay feature.
Pull-down menus make managing the game easier.

Package contents
Hardball II includes the following items:
 Two Floppy Disks
 Hardball II Manual (60 pages)
 Hardball II Batting Commands Sheet
 Hardball II Fielding Command Chart
 Hardball II Copy Protection Code Wheel
The code wheel contains three wheels. The outer wheel contains the last name of baseball players. The middle ring contains the players' first names. The inner ring contains years. When the rings are properly aligned, cut outs in the third ring reveal the players' baseball stats. These stats must be entered into the program before Hardball II will load.

Reception
HardBall II sold roughly 100,000 copies.

In the June 1990 edition of Games International, Brian Walker admired the available customization options, saying that it added a "subtlety" to the game. He called the graphics "excellent", and thought that this would help popularize the game of baseball in the United Kingdom. He concluded by giving the game above-average ratings of 9 out of 10 for game play and 8 out of 10 for graphics, saying, "Quality products like Hardball II can only spread the word."

References

External links
 HardBall II at Amiga Hall of Light
 

1989 video games
Accolade (company) games
Amiga games
Baseball video games
DOS games
Classic Mac OS games
HardBall!
Video games developed in Canada
Distinctive Software games
Single-player video games